was a railway station on the Koizumi Line in Ōra, Ōra District, Gunma, Japan, which was operated by the private railway operator Tobu Railway.

History 
The station opened on March 1, 1933, as a station on the Koizumi Line, then operated by the Joshu Railway.

Mujinazuka Station (between Narushima Station and Hon-Nakano Station), as well as Kobugannon Station, closed on December 25, 1941, after the Koizumi Line was purchased by Tobu Railway in 1937.

References 
 Ora-machi town history (local guide)

Defunct railway stations in Japan
Railway stations in Gunma Prefecture
Railway stations in Japan opened in 1933
Railway stations closed in 1941